Santorcaz is a  town and municipality in the Community of Madrid, Spain.

Sights include the church of San Torcuato and the  annexed castle of Torremocha (14th century).

Santorcaz had a population (as of 2010) of 822.

References

Municipalities in the Community of Madrid